Mary Jenkins Community Praise House is a historic church located on Saint Helena Island near Frogmore, Beaufort County, South Carolina. It was built about 1900, and is a narrow, one-story gable roofed building of frame construction with the entrance in the gable end. It is significant as one of four known extant African-American praise houses on St. Helena Island.  The building remains in use.

It was listed in the National Register of Historic Places in 1989.

References

African-American history of South Carolina
Churches on the National Register of Historic Places in South Carolina
Churches completed in 1900
Churches in Beaufort County, South Carolina
National Register of Historic Places in Beaufort County, South Carolina